Hakaru Masumoto (1895–1987) was a pioneer in metal and alloy research. He discovered numerous superior and unique alloys, and contributed to improving the performance of precision machinery.

A student of Kotaro Honda, Masumoto developed a magnetic metal powder Sendust in 1936, and was the winner of the Imperial Prize of the Japan Academy in 1946.

References 

1895 births
1987 deaths
People from Hiroshima
Japanese metallurgists
Academic staff of Tohoku University
Tohoku University alumni
Grand Cordons of the Order of the Rising Sun
Recipients of the Order of Culture